Lalehzar (also Romanized as Lālehzār) is a city & capital of Lalehzar District, Lalehzar Rural District, Bardsir County, Kerman Province, Iran. At the 2006 census, its population was 2,933, in 697 families.

References 

Populated places in Bardsir County
Cities in Kerman Province